SoundHound AI, Inc. is an audio and speech recognition company founded in 2005. It develops speech recognition, natural language understanding, sound recognition and search technologies. Its featured products include Houndify, a Voice AI developer platform, Hound, a voice-enabled digital assistant, and music recognition mobile app SoundHound. The company’s headquarters are in Santa Clara, California.

History
The company was founded in 2005 by Keyvan Mohajer, an Iranian-Canadian computer scientist who had founded a number of dot com ventures before starting SoundHound.

In 2009, the company's Midomi app was rebranded as SoundHound but is still available as a web version on midomi.com. In 2012, SoundHound announced it had over 100 million users globally. In 2014, SoundHound became the first music-search product available as a wearable.

In 2015, SoundHound became the first music recognition service shipping in autos, in a partnership with Hyundai, in the new Genesis model.

By May 2016, SoundHound had over 300 million users globally.

In 2018, SoundHound Inc. announced partnerships with Hyundai, Mercedes-Benz, and Honda to provide voice interaction for their products using its Houndify voice AI platform. 

SoundHound won the 2020 Webby Award for Productivity (Voice) in the category Apps, Mobile & Voice. In June of that year, the company announced partnerships with Snap Inc. as the technology behind Voice Scan in the Snapchat app, and Mastercard to voice-enable their new Drive Through solutions.

On November 16 2021, SoundHound announced plans to become a public company via a SPAC merger with Archimedes Tech SPAC Partners Co. On April 28, 2022, the combined company SoundHound AI, Inc. went public, listed under the symbol SOUN on the Nasdaq. In 2022, the company laid off 10% of its staff and enforced salary cuts and it was reported that SoundHound raised less than half of what it originally projected in its SPAC merger deal.

Funding
According to an article of June 2015 SoundHound Inc. had raised a total of $40 million in funding from Global Catalyst Partners, Translink Capital, Walden Venture Capital, and other investors. This included $7 million in a Series B funding round the company secured in October 2008, bringing total funds raised to $12 million at this time. The round was led by TransLink Capital with the participation of JAIC America and Series A investor Global Catalyst Partners. In 2009 it attracted additional funding from Larry Marcus at Walden Venture Capital, who had previously invested in music startups Pandora and Snocap. The $4 million funding round was led by Walden Venture Capital VII, with the participation of an unnamed device manufacturer.

In January 2017, the company raised another $75 million in an investment round that included Nvidia, Samsung, Kleiner Perkins Caulfield & Byers, and others.

Announced in May 2018, SoundHound raised $100 million from a funding round led by Tencent and joined by Daimler AG, Hyundai Motors, Midea Group, and Orange S.A. With this funding, the valuation of the company reached $1 billion.

In November 2021, Soundhound first announced the merger Archimedes Tech SPAC Partners Co to go public with $2.1B valuation, then undisclosed investment from Qatar First Bank. Both are expected to close in the first quarter of 2022.

See also
 Shazam
 Query by humming
 Speech recognition

References

External links

Android (operating system) software
IOS software
Symbian software
Music search engines
Software companies established in 2005
Companies based in California
BlackBerry software
Virtual assistants
Natural language processing software
Acoustic fingerprinting
American companies established in 2005
2005 establishments in California
Special-purpose acquisition companies
Companies listed on the Nasdaq